Great White is an American hard rock band from Los Angeles, California. Formed in 1979, the group was originally known as Dante Fox and consisted of lead vocalist Lisa Baker, guitarist Mark Kendall, bassist Don Costa and drummer Tony Richards. The band's current lineup includes Kendall alongside guitarist and keyboardist Michael Lardie, drummer Audie Desbrow (both of whom originally joined in 1985 and rejoined in 2006), bassist Scott Snyder (since 2008) and lead vocalist Brett Carlisle (since 2022).

Since December 2011, former Great White vocalist Jack Russell has also been performing with his own version of the band called Great White featuring Jack Russell (formerly Jack Russell's Great White). The group's current lineup includes lead guitarist Robby Lochner (who joined in 2011), rhythm guitarist Tony Montana (former bassist for Great White who joined Russell's band in 2013), drummer Dicki Fliszar (who joined in 2014) and bassist Dan McNay (who joined in 2016).

History

1977–1987: Early years 
Jack Russell and Mark Kendall first met in 1977. The pair worked together in bands with several names and lineups, before Russell was arrested for shooting a live-in maid in 1978. Kendall subsequently formed Dante Fox the next year with vocalist Lisa Baker, bassist Don Costa and drummer Tony Richards. Baker joined George Lynch's Xciter after around six months, with Butch Say taking her place. After 18 months in prison, Russell was released and almost immediately took over as Dante Fox frontman. By late 1982, both Costa and Richards had left Dante Fox to join newly-formed W.A.S.P.

Costa and Richards were replaced by Lorne Black and Gary Holland, respectively. Before the end of the year, the group changed its name to Great White and released its debut EP On Your Knees on the independent label Enigma Records. The band subsequently signed with Alan Niven's new label Aegean Records and released Out of the Night in 1983. This was followed by the group's self-titled full-length debut in 1984. By January 1985, Holland had been replaced by Audie Desbrow, and Michael Lardie had joined on rhythm guitar and keyboards; both debuted on 1986's Shot in the Dark.

1987–2001: Later work 
Shortly after the release of Great White's third studio album Once Bitten in June 1987, Lorne Black was replaced by Tony Montana. The new bassist performed on ...Twice Shy (1989) and Hooked (1991) before leaving in early 1992 during rehearsals for Psycho City, with Dave "The Beast" Spitz taking over for the album's recording. For the subsequent tour, former Dio bassist Teddy Cook joined the band. Cook remained for just one studio album, Sail Away, before he was fired for being a "poser" – in late 1995, Spitz stepped in again to record Let It Rock. Former Quiet Riot bassist Sean McNabb joined for the subsequent tour.

Great White issued Great Zeppelin: A Tribute to Led Zeppelin in 1998 and Can't Get There from Here in 1999, before undergoing a string of lineup changes. First to leave was founding member Mark Kendall, who announced his departure on January 20, 2000. Matthew Johnson took his place the next month. Lardie left next, replaced by Ty Longley in July. In September, drummer Audie Desbrow announced his departure, claiming that he had been fired. He was followed by McNabb. Russell opted to continue touring, adding Longley's Samantha 7 bandmates Krys Baratto on bass and Francis Ruiz on drums. By November 2001, however, he had decided to disband the group. A final show on New Year's Eve, featuring Kendall, Lardie, McNabb and Samantha 7 drummer Derrick Pontier, was released as Thank You... Goodnight! in 2002.

2002–2011: Reformation 
Less than a year after Great White disbanded, Jack Russell reunited with Mark Kendall in November 2002 under the moniker "Jack Russell's Great White", with a lineup including second guitarist Ty Longley, bassist David Filice, drummer Eric Powers and keyboardist Yuko Tamura. The group embarked on a tour, which was cut short on February 20, 2003, when a pyrotechnics accident at the start of their performance caused The Station nightclub fire. Among the 100 people killed in the fire was Longley, who was initially reported missing but reported dead four days later.

A few months after the fire, Jack Russell's Great White began touring to raise money for the families of the victims, with Russell and Kendall joined by guitarist and keyboardist Tyler Nelson, bassist Scott Pounds and drummer Derrick Pontier. Touring continued until August 2005, when all future dates were cancelled due to undisclosed "medical reasons". In December 2006, a reunion of Russell, Kendall, Michael Lardie, Sean McNabb and Audie Desbrow was announced to mark the band's 25th anniversary. Back to the Rhythm, the first Great White studio album since 1999, was released in 2007.

During a tour in 2008, McNabb decided to leave Great White. He was replaced that May by Scott Snyder. He debuted on Rising, issued early the next year. During the subsequent tour, Russell was forced to take a break to undergo surgery for a perforated bowel. He was temporarily replaced by XYZ's Terry Ilous. After one show with former Rough Cutt and Quiet Riot frontman Paul Shortino, former Warrant vocalist Jani Lane took over for a run of shows later in the year. Ilous returned in early 2011, although it was planned that Russell would return once he had recovered from surgery. By December, however, he had formed his own version of the band, with Ilous remaining in the main group.

Since 2011: Two bands 
The first lineup of Jack Russell's Great White included Russell alongside two former members of Great White (rhythm guitarist Matthew Johnson and drummer Derrick Pontier), as well as lead guitarist Robby Lochner and bassist Dario Seixas. By the time they performed their first show in January 2012, Johnson had been replaced by Evan Haymond. After the band was renamed "Great White featuring Jack Russell", Seixas was replaced by former Great White bassist Tony Montana in July 2013.

Montana switched to guitar later in the year, as Chris Tristram took over on bass, while Pontier was replaced by Dicki Fliszar; this lineup released the group's first single, "Hard Habit", in 2014. By 2016, Tristram had been replaced by Dan McNay. The band released He Saw It Comin' in 2017 and Once Bitten Acoustic Bytes in 2020.

The lineup of the original Great White remained stable from Russell's 2011 departure until 2018, releasing studio albums Elation in 2012 and Full Circle in 2017, and live albums 30 Years: Live from the Sunset Strip in 2013 and Metal Meltdown in 2016. In July 2018, the group fired Terry Ilous and replaced him with Mitch Malloy. The new vocalist remained until May 2022, when he was replaced by Andrew Freeman.

Members

Current Great White members

Former Great White members

Jack Russell's Great White

Timelines

Dante Fox/Great White

Jack Russell's Great White

Lineups

Dante Fox/Great White

Jack Russell's Great White

References

External links 
Great White official website
Jack Russell's Great White official website

Great White